Mireille Dargent (born 1951) is a French film actress.

Career
She is best known for appearing in Jean Rollin films, like Requiem for a Vampire, alongside Marie-Pierre Castel in the two leading roles.  When an agent introduced Mireille to Rollin, Rollin discovered he was stealing her wages and keeping them for himself, at this point he hired a lawyer and the agent was made to pay back everything to Mireille. Her other appearances in Rollin's films include La Rose de Fer (The Iron Rose), Les Démoniaques (The Demoniacs) and Lévres de Sang (Lips of Blood).  Mireille has also worked with directors Pierre Chevalier, Marius Lesoeur and Jacques Orth.  She has been credited in her films as "Dily D'Argent" and "Dily Dargent".

Filmography
 1971: Requiem pour un Vampire - 'Michelle'
 1973: Avortement clandestin - 'Sophie Beltois'
 1973: La Rose de Fer - 'Clown'
 1974: Les Démoniaques - 'Clown'
 1975: Lévres de Sang
 1976: Paris Porno
 2007: La nuit des horloges (archive images)

References

External links
 

1951 births
Living people
French film actresses
20th-century French actresses